Pavo Raudsepp (born 9 October 1973) is an Estonian cross-country skier. He competed in the men's sprint event at the 2002 Winter Olympics.

References

External links
 

1973 births
Living people
Estonian male cross-country skiers
Olympic cross-country skiers of Estonia
Cross-country skiers at the 2002 Winter Olympics
People from Järva Parish
21st-century Estonian people